Roberto Parra Mateo (born 6 April 1976 in Socuéllamos, Ciudad Real) is a Spanish middle distance runner. He specialized in the 800 and 1500 metres events.

He was municipal councillor in his native town from 2011 to 2014.

Competition record

Personal bests
800 metres - 1:44.97 min (1996)
1500 metres - 3:35.02 min (2003)

References

External links

Spanish male middle-distance runners
Municipal councillors in the province of Ciudad Real
Athletes (track and field) at the 1996 Summer Olympics
Athletes (track and field) at the 2000 Summer Olympics
Olympic athletes of Spain
1976 births
Living people
20th-century Spanish people